Daniel Repacholi (born 15 May 1982) is an Australian sport shooter and politician who has competed at four Olympic Games. He is a member of the Australian Labor Party (ALP) and was elected as a member for the New South Wales seat of Hunter in the 2022 election following the retirement of Joel Fitzgibbon.

Repacholi is a former coalminer and runs a small engineering business with 60 employees in the Hunter Valley. He is a member of the Cessnock Hall of Fame, having been inducted in May 2020 for services to sport.

Early life

Repacholi has competed as a sports shooter since he was 12 years old. He started a trade apprenticeship at 15.

Shooting career

He competed in the 10 metre air pistol, finishing in equal 36th place, and the 50 metre pistol, finishing 23rd, at the 2004 Summer Olympics in Athens. At the 2008 Summer Olympics in Beijing, he competed in the same events, finishing 31st in the 10 metre air pistol, and 40th in the 50 metre pistol.  At the 2012 London Olympics he again competed in the two pistol events, finishing 28th in the 10 metre air pistol and 19th in the 50 metre pistol.

Repacholi won a gold medal and a bronze medal at the 2006 Commonwealth Games in Melbourne. At the 2010 Commonwealth Games in Delhi, Repacholi won a bronze medal. At the 2014 Commonwealth Games in Glasgow, Repacholi won a gold medal in the 10m Air Pistol and bronze in the 50m Pistol events.

Repacholi qualified for the Tokyo 2020 Olympics where he competed in the individual and team 10m air pistol events. He did not score sufficient points to advance past qualification.

Political career

In October 2021, Repacholi was selected as the Australian Labor Party candidate for the Division of Hunter for the 2022 Australian federal election. He was endorsed by the Labor leader Anthony Albanese and the Construction, Forestry, Maritime, Mining and Energy Union (CFMEU). Some rank and file Labor members were angry with the lack of a rank and file vote to choose Repacholi as a candidate, in addition to his support of coal mining.

Views 

Repacholi has stated a focus on supporting the mining industry, and improving employment opportunities for tradespeoples, trainees and apprentices. Repacholi has suggested that opponents of coal mining should "sit in the dark and freeze” in winter.

After competing in the 2010 Commonwealth Games in New Delhi, India, Repacholi described the country as a "shit hole" on social media. He has also published sexually explicit comments on social media and followed Instagram accounts featuring naked women posing with assault rifles and near-naked women in sexually provocative poses. Repacholi has apologised publicly for making these comments and deleted his Instagram account.

References

External links
 Australian Olympic Committee profile

1982 births
Australian male sport shooters
Australian sportsperson-politicians
Commonwealth Games bronze medallists for Australia
Commonwealth Games gold medallists for Australia
Commonwealth Games medallists in shooting
ISSF pistol shooters
Living people
Olympic shooters of Australia
Shooters at the 2004 Summer Olympics
Shooters at the 2006 Commonwealth Games
Shooters at the 2008 Summer Olympics
Shooters at the 2010 Commonwealth Games
Shooters at the 2012 Summer Olympics
Shooters at the 2014 Commonwealth Games
Shooters at the 2016 Summer Olympics
Shooters at the 2018 Commonwealth Games
Shooters at the 2020 Summer Olympics
Sportspeople from Melbourne
People from Carlton, Victoria
Sportsmen from Victoria (Australia)
Businesspeople from Melbourne
21st-century Australian businesspeople
21st-century Australian politicians
Australian Labor Party politicians
Members of the Australian House of Representatives for Hunter
Medallists at the 2006 Commonwealth Games
Medallists at the 2010 Commonwealth Games
Medallists at the 2014 Commonwealth Games
Medallists at the 2018 Commonwealth Games
People from Melton, Victoria